The sun-burst soft coral (Malacacanthus capensis) is a species of colonial soft corals in the family Alcyoniidae. It is the only species known in the genus Malacacanthus.

Description
Sun-burst soft corals grow up to 15 cm tall and consist of an orange column with a ball at its top. They are somewhat mushroom-shaped and when feeding have bright orange polyps radiating from the ball on striped transparent stalks.

Distribution
This species is known from the Cape Peninsula to southern KwaZulu-Natal off the South African coast, and lives from 13-93m under water.

Ecology
When threatened the whole ball may withdraw into the top of the body column. In between the feeding polyps are tiny dot-like organs known as siphonozooids which are used to re-inflate the colony after it contracts.

References

Alcyoniidae
Animals described in 1900